Dragoness may refer to a female Dragon.

Dragoness may also refer to:

 Dragoness (comics), a fictional mutant villain character in the Marvel Comics Universe